The 1988 Cedok Open, also known as the Prague Open was a men's tennis tournament played on outdoor clay courts at the I. Czech Lawn Tennis Club in Prague, Czechoslovakia that was part of the 1988 Grand Prix circuit. It was the second edition of the tournament and was held from 8 August until 14 August 1988. Third-seeded Thomas Muster won the singles title.

Finals

Singles
 Thomas Muster defeated  Guillermo Pérez Roldán 6–4, 5–7, 6–2
 It was Muster's 3rd singles title of the year and the 4th of his career.

Doubles
 Petr Korda /  Jaroslav Navrátil defeated  Thomas Muster /  Horst Skoff 7–5, 7–6

References

External links
 ITF tournament edition details

Cedok Open
Prague Open (1987–1999)
Cedok Open